The following is the list of episodes for the Japanese Anime series Tytania. The anime series is produced by Artland and sound productions by Magic Capsule. The episodes are directed by Noboru Ishiguro based on the original novel created by Yoshiki Tanaka. The characters from the anime are designed by Noboru Sugimitsu based on the original character designs by Haruhiko Mikimoto. The series began airing on Japan's NHK broadcasting station on 9 October 2008. Two pieces of theme music are used, one opening and one ending theme. The opening theme is titled "Ano Sora wo, Ike" performed by Ken Nishikiori while the ending theme is titled "Lost in Space" sung by Psychic Lover.

Episode list

References

Tytania